The Wiltshire Museum, formerly known as Wiltshire Heritage Museum and Devizes Museum, is a museum, archive and library and art gallery in Devizes, Wiltshire, England. The museum was established and is run by the Wiltshire Archaeological and Natural History Society (WANHS), a registered charity founded in 1853.  After the purchase of an old grammar school the museum was opened in 1873.  Subsequently, it expanded into two Georgian houses on either side and still occupies this location today.

The museum maintains a collection covering the archaeology, art, history and natural history of Wiltshire.  This collection covers periods of history from as far back as the Palaeolithic and also includes Neolithic, Bronze Age, Roman, Saxon, Mediaeval and more recent historical artefacts. Among the prehistoric collections are items from the Stonehenge and Avebury World Heritage Site.  Several of the collections have been designated as being a significant part of England's cultural heritage.

One of the most important collections at the museum is the finds from Bush Barrow, an early Bronze Age burial mound in Stonehenge World Heritage Site. The barrow was excavated by William Cunnington in 1808 and produced the richest and most important finds from a Bronze Age grave in the Stonehenge Landscape to date. The finds were acquired by the museum in 1883 and were displayed there until 1922 when they were indefinitely loaned to the British Museum. After a controversial restoration of the largest piece that may not reflect its original finish, the pieces were returned to Devizes in 1985. They are on display in the Gold from the Time of Stonehenge exhibition, opened in 2013.

The natural history collection includes remains of a plesiosaur called Bathyspondylus found at Swindon in 1774. Bathyspondylus swindoniensis was first described in 1982 from the museum's specimens.

In 2010 the museum ran a community bus service, the "Henge Hopper", linking Avebury with Amesbury and Stonehenge.

The museum held a major exhibition of works by Eric Ravilious titled Eric Ravilious Downland Man from September 2021 until January 2022. It featured loans from a number of institutions including the Victoria and Albert Museum, the British Museum, the Imperial War Museum and the Towner Gallery as well as works from private collections.

See also
The Salisbury Museum
Wiltshire Record Society

References

External links

 

Bronze Age England
Museums in Wiltshire
Stonehenge
Archaeological museums in England
Natural history museums in England
Libraries in Wiltshire
Museums established in 1873
1873 establishments in England
Devizes